Agama insularis, the insular agama, is a species of lizard in the family Agamidae. It is a small lizard found on Rooma Island in Guinea.

References

Agama (genus)
Reptiles described in 1918
Taxa named by Paul Chabanaud